Cannavale is an Italian surname. Notable people with the surname include:

Bobby Cannavale (born 1970), American actor
Enzo Cannavale (1928–2011), Italian actor
Jake Cannavale (born 1995), American actor

Italian-language surnames